The Wisley Golf Club is a golf club in Wisley in Surrey, England. The club is only open to members and their guests.

The club has 700 members, each of whom own a single share in the club. The club is owned entirely by its members. Proposed members must pass a 'playing interview' with the club's Chief Executive, Director of Membership or Director of Golf.

Golf Monthly magazine listed the club as one of the '10 Most Exclusive Golf Clubs In the UK' writing that the club "has some great practice facilities" and is "home to a number of high-profile golfers and celebrities". The golfer Francesco Molinari practised at Wisley before his move to the United States.

The club has three nine-hole loops, named The Church, The Mill and The Garden, which GQ describes as "offer[ing] those fortunate enough to belong, a varied and invariably pristine facility". The course was designed by Robert Trent Jones Jr and opened in 1991.

Gallery

References

External links

Wisley at Top 100 Golf Courses

1991 establishments in England
Golf clubs and courses in Surrey
Wisley